The Swan Book is the third novel by the Indigenous Australian author Alexis Wright.  It met with critical acclaim when it was published, and was short-listed for Australia's premier literary prize, the Miles Franklin Award.

Plot Introduction
The Swan Book is set in the future, with Aboriginal people still living under the Intervention in the north, in an environment fundamentally altered by climate change.  It follows a girl who is pulled from a tree as a child after having been lost and gang-raped, and how she grows up raised by a European immigrant and seemingly guided by swans.  After the death of her guardian, she is betrothed to a boy who grows up to become the first Indigenous President of Australia (Prime Minister has been abandoned in this future), and later marries him, despite retaining a childlike mind even as an adult.

Awards and nominations 
 2014 shortlisted Victorian Premier's Literary Awards — Victorian Premier's Literary Award for Indigenous Writing
 2014 shortlisted the Stella Prize 
 2014 winner ASAL Awards — ALS Gold Medal 
 2014 shortlisted Miles Franklin Literary Award 
 2014 shortlisted New South Wales Premier's Literary Awards — Christina Stead Prize for Fiction
 2016 winner Kate Challis RAKA Award

Reviews
Gleeson-White, Jane. "Going viral"  2013-08-23. Retrieved 2015-07-03.
Tierney, James. "The Swan Book"  2015-02-10. Retrieved 2015-07-03.
Webb, Jen. "Living wound: The Swan Book"  2013-09. Retrieved 2015-07-03.

External links 
 Official listing for the novel at the website of Giramondo Publishing.

Footnotes 

2013 Australian novels
ALS Gold Medal winning works
Giramondo Publishing books